The Lubbock Texas Temple is the 109th operating temple of the Church of Jesus Christ of Latter-day Saints (LDS Church).

The Lubbock Texas Temple joins three other LDS temples in Texas in serving 220,000 members of the church who live in the state. The Lubbock Temple serves western Texas including the Texas panhandle and eastern New Mexico, an area with about 13,500 members.

History
Despite a rainstorm, many attended the temple groundbreaking ceremony held on November 4, 2000.

During the open house held prior to the dedication of the new temple, more than 21,500 people toured the building. The Lubbock Texas Temple was dedicated by LDS Church president Gordon B. Hinckley on April 21, 2002.

The temple is a smaller temple and shares a site with a stake center. The exterior of the temple is finished with empress white and majestic gray granite quarried in China. It is of classic modern design with a single spire, topped by a statue of the Angel Moroni.

In 2020, the Lubbock Texas Temple was closed in response to the coronavirus pandemic.

See also

 Comparison of temples of The Church of Jesus Christ of Latter-day Saints
 List of temples of The Church of Jesus Christ of Latter-day Saints
 List of temples of The Church of Jesus Christ of Latter-day Saints by geographic region
 Temple architecture (Latter-day Saints)
 The Church of Jesus Christ of Latter-day Saints in Texas

References

External links
 Official Lubbock Texas Temple page
Lubbock Texas Temple at ChurchofJesusChristTemples.org

21st-century Latter Day Saint temples
Religious buildings and structures in Texas
Buildings and structures in Lubbock, Texas
Temples (LDS Church) completed in 2002
Temples (LDS Church) in Texas
2002 establishments in Texas